Vatica glabrata is a tree in the family Dipterocarpaceae, native to Borneo. The specific epithet means "smooth-skinned".

Description
The inflorescences bear cream-coloured flowers.

Distribution and habitat
Vatica glabrata is endemic to Borneo.

Conservation
Vatica glabrata has been assessed as vulnerable on the IUCN Red List. It is threatened by logging for its timber.

References

glabrata
Endemic flora of Borneo
Plants described in 1982